Stephanie Louise Williams (born 12 August 1992) is a footballer who plays as a midfielder for Oxford United W.F.C. Williams received her first senior international call-up in 2015, after establishing herself as a holding midfielder in Yeovil Town's FA WSL 2 campaign. She started Wales's 2–1 defeat by Slovakia in April 2015.

In August 2017, Williams was released by Yeovil Town.

Personal life

Williams's girlfriend is fellow footballer and England national team member Bethany England.

References

External links
 

1992 births
Living people
Yeovil Town L.F.C. players
Wales women's international footballers
Welsh women's footballers
Women's Super League players
Cardiff City Ladies F.C. players
FA Women's National League players
Women's association football midfielders
Oxford United W.F.C. players